Jerónimo Carvalho de Sousa (born 13 April 1947) is a Portuguese politician who served as General Secretary of the Portuguese Communist Party from the 17th Congress of the Party in November 2004 to the party's National Conference in November 2022.

He is a member of the Assembly of the Republic and was also a candidate in the 2006 presidential election.

Electoral results

1996 Portuguese presidential election

Jerónimo de Sousa left the race in favour of Jorge Sampaio.

2006 Portuguese presidential election

Jerónimo de Sousa finished fourth with 474,083 votes (8.64%).

References

1947 births
Living people
People from Loures
Portuguese Communist Party politicians
Members of the Assembly of the Republic (Portugal)
Candidates for President of Portugal
Portuguese anti-fascists
Portuguese communists